Mukwaya is a Ugandan Baganda surname, and may refer to many people.

A
Abdullah Mukwaya, Qadi of Mbarara District and father of Usama Mukwaya

J
Janat Mukwaya, a Ugandan politician

U
Usama Mukwaya, a Ugandan film director

O
Olive Kazaarwe Mukwaya, a Ugandan lawyer and judge